Yanna Darili (Greek:Γιάννα Ντάριλη) is a Greek-American model, actress, journalist, producer, television presenter and fitness expert. Her mother is from the Greek island of Kos and her father from Kastaniani.

She is best known for her fitness segments on ANT1 Greek morning show "Proinos Kafes" as well as host of the first English language ERT show "Hellenic Weekly". She was master of ceremonies of the pre-game Opening and Closing ceremonies of the Athens 2004 Olympics. She is also known for her guest appearances on the Today show during the Athens 2004 Olympics hosted by Katie Couric.

Her extensive career includes; on air talent, writing and directing over 80 travel and cooking features on Greece. Yanna shares her travel experience as a contributor to the huffingtonpost.com, and  health and fitness articles  on thriveglobal.com . Her latest appearance as Host of the PBS Series “Mediterranean Blue” aired nationwide on various PBS affiliates. Yanna also organizes and moderates panels for the United Nations, SRC, Salus Club. Yanna recently became an ambassador for the Integrated Nutrition Institute and is a certified Health Coach & Integrated Nutritionist.
Yanna Darili organizes and Moderates Mens Health Panel at United Nations RSC https://www.thriveglobal.com/stories/27365-united-nations-src-salus-wellness-held-panel-on-the-future-of-women-s-health

As of August 2012, Yanna Darili headed up a private investment group acquiring New Greek TV a Greek-American television station on Time Warner Cable.

References

 http://www.givemeastoria.com/blog/2014/12/12/yanna-darilis/

«Γιάννα Νταρίλη: Ο αθλητισμός, η τηλεόραση και άγνωστες πτυχές της ζωής της», Συνέντευξη στη Δέσποινα Αφεντούλη, στο πλαίσιο αφιερώματος του μηνιαίου περιοδικού «ΓΥΝΑΙΚΑ» της εφημερίδας «Εθνικός Κήρυξ», τεύχος 226, Αύγουστος 2018.
- https://www.ekirikas.com/wp-content/uploads/2018/08/226_ginaika_site.pdf

External links
Official Website

Living people
People from Kos
American television reporters and correspondents
Queens College, City University of New York alumni
American people of Greek descent
Television producers from New York City
American women television producers
Year of birth missing (living people)
Actresses from New York City
Models from New York City
Female models from New York (state)
American women television journalists
21st-century American women